Clericalism in Iran has a long history and had a remarkable impact on Iranian society, politics as well as on Islamic theology.

Emergence
There are controversies about the emergence of clericalism in Iran. Some scholars believe that clericalism dates back to 1000 years ago.

Schools

Shia:
Najaf seminaries
Qom seminaries
Mashhad Seminaries
Sunni:
Zahedan seminaries

Structure and functions:

Over the course of history, Iranian seminaries have had traditional functions in the religious sphere to provide support to civil society in the country. However, after the Iranian revolution in 1979, seminaries have been highly politicized and their independence greatly reduced. The revolution created a new political order based on Shiite theological foundations and the absolute ruling power was given to a Shiite jurist/cleric.

The history of Qom seminaries dates back to 3rd century (Hijri). Hossein Ibn Said Ahvazi, a famous theologian, moved from Kufa to Qom. He educated the first generation of clerics in Qom.

Impact on the economy
Many clerics have been involved in high-profile economic activities, most notably Akbar Hashemi Rafsanjani, Abbas Vaez-Tabasi and Nasser Makarem Shirazi.

Impact on Iranian politics
Clerics involved in politics during Safavid and Qajar era
Allameh Majlesi
Mirza Shirazi
Seyyed Jamaluddin Asadabadi (Afghan)

 Clerics involved in the Iranian Constitutional Revolution
Seyyed Mohammad Tabataba'i
Seyyed Abdollah Behbehani
Sheikh Mohammad Khiabani 
Mohammad Kazem Khorasani 
Sheikh Fazlollah Nouri (against the Constitutional Revolution)
Mohammed Kazem Yazdi (against the Constitutional Revolution)

Influential Clerics of the Pahlavi era
Seyyed Hassan Modarres
Seyyed Abolghasem Kashani
Navvab Safavi
Sheikh Mohammad Taghi Falsafi

Clerics involved in the Iranian Revolution
Ruhollah Khomeini
Hosseinali Montazeri 
Morteza Motahhari 
Mohammad Beheshti

 Clerics acting as high officials

Ali Khamenei 
Akbar Hashemi Rafsanjani
Mohammad Khatami 
Hassan Rouhani
Mohammad Yazdi
Ali Meshkini
Mahmoud Hashemi Shahroudi
Ahmad Jannati
Mehdi Karroubi
 Ebrahim Raisi
 Ahmad Khatami
 Sadeq Larijani

Political parties founded by clerics
Association of Combatant Clerics
Combatant Clergy Association

Institutions exclusively associated with clerics
Special Clerical Court

Impact on other societies
Ali Sistani

See also
Islam in Iran

References

External links
History of Qom seminaries (in Persian)
Organization of Shafei Sunni Clericalism in Iran (in Persian)
Organization of Hanafi Sunni Clericalism in Iran (in Persian)

 
Islam in Iran